Khao Kho, is a 1143 m high mountain in Phetchabun Province, Thailand. It is in Khao Kho District. The mountain is part of the western range of the Phetchabun Mountains. 

Khao Kho was named either after the Ceylon oak or after Livistona speciosa, a kind of palm tree. Both species are known as kho in Thai and are abundant in the area.

Summit
A road leads to the summit where there is a memorial erected to commemorate the victims of the battles between the Royal Thai Armed Forces and insurgents of the Communist Party of Thailand. Between 1968 and 1981 there was unrest around the mountain  where the provinces of  Phetchabun and Phitsanulok meet.

See also
List of mountains in Thailand

References

External links

Khao Kho Sacrificial Monument - Tourism Thailand

Geography of Loei province
Mountains of Thailand
Phetchabun Mountains